Alberta's Industrial Heartland (also known as Upgrader Alley or the Heartland) is the largest industrial area in Western Canada and a joint land-use planning and development initiative between five municipalities in the Edmonton Capital Region to attract investment in the chemical, petrochemical, oil, and gas industries to the region. It is "home to more than 40 petrochemical companies" and is one of Canada's largest petrochemical processing regions." By July 2015 there was $13 billion invested in new industrial projects providing employment for 25,000 in the Alberta's Industrial Heartland.

Geography 
Alberta's Industrial Heartland (AIH) comprises  of land split between the City of Fort Saskatchewan, Lamont County, Strathcona County, and Sturgeon County, as well as the  Edmonton Energy and Technology Park in northeast Edmonton. The largest completed project to date is the Scotford Complex, which includes an upgrader, a refinery, and two railyards.

Membership 
Alberta's Industrial Heartland Association (AIHA) was founded in 1998 by the City of Fort Saskatchewan, Lamont County, Strathcona County, and Sturgeon County. The City of Edmonton became a member of AIHA in 2010. The nearby towns of Bruderheim, Gibbons and Redwater are associate members of AIHA.

Refinery Row (Edmonton) 

Refinery Row refers to the concentration of oil refineries in west Sherwood Park, Strathcona County, Alberta, just east of the city of Edmonton. The two main refineries in Refinery Row are the Strathcona Refinery (Imperial Oil), and the Suncor Edmonton Refinery (Suncor Energy) The other main refineries in the Edmonton area are also located in Strathcona County, in a separate concentration around Scotford, Alberta.

Air quality 
Air quality in the Industrial Heartland and surrounding area is monitored by the Fort Air Partnership (FAP).  FAP is a not-for-profit organization formed in 1997 to monitor the air within a 4,500-square-kilometre airshed located immediately north and east of Edmonton. The FAP area includes the city of Fort Saskatchewan, the towns of Gibbons, Bon Accord, Bruderheim, Lamont, Redwater, Waskatenau, portions of the counties of Sturgeon, Westlock, Thorhild, Lamont and Strathcona, and Elk Island National Park. Alberta’s Industrial Heartland is located within FAP’s borders. FAP collects and reports on air quality data in a region encompassing one of the most concentrated industrial development areas in Alberta. 

FAP’s work is open and transparent, governed by a multi-stakeholder Board of Directors, guided by a scientific Technical Working Group and driven by national and provincial standards. Continuous data is collected and made available to anyone. FAP has 10 continuous air monitoring stations in and around Alberta’s Industrial Heartland.

References

External links 

1998 establishments in Alberta
Economy of Edmonton
Edmonton Metropolitan Region
Geography of Edmonton
Fort Saskatchewan
Industrial parks in Canada
Lamont County
Strathcona County
Sturgeon County